Miguel Torruco (1920–1956) was a Mexican film actor. He was one of the stars of the Golden Age of Mexican cinema until his sudden death at the age of thirty six after falling off a horse. He was married to the actress María Elena Marqués.

Selected filmography
 Acapulco (1952)
 Remember to Live (1953)
 The River and Death (1954)
 When I Leave (1954)

References

Bibliography
 Goble, Alan. The Complete Index to Literary Sources in Film. Walter de Gruyter, 1999.

External links

1920 births
1956 deaths
Mexican male film actors
Male actors from Chiapas